Backhousia citriodora (common names lemon myrtle, lemon scented myrtle, lemon scented ironwood) is a flowering plant in the family Myrtaceae, genus Backhousia. It is endemic to subtropical rainforests of central and south-eastern Queensland, Australia, with a natural distribution from Mackay to Brisbane. Other common names are  sweet verbena tree, sweet verbena myrtle, (lemon scented verbena is another species), and lemon scented backhousia.

Growth
It can reach  in height, but is often smaller. The flowers are creamy-white,  in diameter, produced in clusters at the ends of the branches from summer through to autumn, after petal fall the calyx is persistent.

Etymology
Lemon myrtle was given the botanical name Backhousia citriodora in 1853 after the English botanist, James Backhouse.

The common name reflects the strong lemon smell of the crushed leaves. "Lemon scented myrtle" was the primary common name until the shortened trade name, "lemon myrtle", was created by the native foods industry to market the leaf for culinary use. Lemon myrtle is now the more common name for the plant and its products.

Lemon myrtle is sometimes confused with "lemon ironbark", which is Eucalyptus staigeriana.

Essential oils

Backhousia citriodora has two essential oil chemotypes:
 The citral chemotype is more prevalent and is cultivated in Australia for flavouring and essential oil. Citral as an isolate in steam distilled lemon myrtle oil is typically 90–98%, and oil yield 1–3% from fresh leaf.  It is the highest natural source of citral.
 The citronellal chemotype is uncommon, and can be used as an insect repellent.

Uses
Indigenous Australians have long used lemon myrtle, both in cuisine and as a healing plant. The oil has the highest citral purity; typically higher than lemongrass. It is also considered to have a "cleaner and sweeter" aroma than comparable sources of citral–lemongrass and Litsea cubeba.

Culinary

Lemon myrtle is one of the well known bushfood flavours and is sometimes referred to as the "Queen of the lemon herbs". The leaf is often used as dried flakes, or in the form of an encapsulated flavour essence for enhanced shelf-life. It has a range of uses, such as lemon myrtle flakes in shortbread; flavouring in pasta; whole leaf with baked fish; infused in macadamia or vegetable oils; and made into tea, including tea blends. It can also be used as a lemon flavour replacement in milk-based foods, such as cheesecake, lemon flavoured ice-cream and sorbet without the curdling problem associated with lemon fruit acidity.

The dried leaf has free radical scavenging ability.

Antimicrobial
Lemon myrtle essential oil possesses antimicrobial properties; however the undiluted essential oil is toxic to human cells in vitro. When diluted to approximately 1%, absorption through the skin and subsequent damage is thought to be minimal. Lemon myrtle oil has a high Rideal–Walker coefficient, a measure of antimicrobial potency. Use of lemon myrtle oil as a treatment for skin lesions caused by molluscum contagiosum virus (MCV), a disease affecting children and immuno-compromised patients, has been investigated. Nine of sixteen patients who were treated with 10% strength lemon myrtle oil showed a significant improvement, compared to none in the control group. A study in 2003 which investigated the effectiveness of different preparations of lemon myrtle against bacteria and fungi concluded that the plant had potential as an antiseptic or as a surface disinfectant, or as an anti-microbial food additive. The oil is a popular ingredient in health care and cleaning products, especially soaps, lotions, skin-whitening preparations and shampoos.

Cultivation
Lemon myrtle is a cultivated ornamental plant. It can be grown from tropical to warm temperate climates, and may handle cooler districts provided it can be protected from frost when young. The principal attraction to gardeners is the lemon smell which perfumes both the leaves and flowers of the tree. Lemon myrtle is a hardy plant which tolerates all but the poorest drained soils. It can be slow growing but responds well to slow release fertilisers.

Seedling lemon myrtle go through a shrubby, slow juvenile growth stage, before developing a dominant trunk. Lemon myrtle can also be propagated from cutting, but is slow to strike. A study into the plant growing adventitious roots found that "actively growing axillary buds, wide stems and mature leaves" are good indicators that a cutting will take root successfully and survive.  A further study on temperature recommended glasshouses for growing cuttings throughout the year.  Growing cuttings from mature trees bypasses the shrubby juvenile stage. Cutting propagation is also used to provide a consistent product in commercial production.

In plantation cultivation the tree is typically maintained as a shrub by regular harvesting from the top and sides. Mechanical harvesting is used in commercial plantations. It is important to retain some lower branches when pruning for plant health. The harvested leaves are dried for leaf spice, or distilled for the essential oil.

The majority of commercial lemon myrtle is grown in Queensland and the north coast of New South Wales, Australia.

A 2009 study has suggested that drying lemon myrtle leaves at higher temperatures improves the citral content of the dried leaves, but discolours the leaves more.

Myrtle rust
A significant fungal pathogen, myrtle rust (Uredo rangelii) was detected in lemon myrtle plantations in January 2011. Myrtle rust severely damages new growth and threatens lemon myrtle production. Controls are being developed.

Lemon myrtle history
 Pre-1788 – Aboriginal people use B.citriodora for medicine and flavouring.
 1853 – Scientifically named Backhousia citriodora by botanist, Ferdinand von Mueller, with the genus named after friend, James Backhouse, quaker missionary and botanist.
 1888 – Bertram isolates citral from B.citriodora oil, and Messrs. , Dresden, write about the essential oil as having “...probably a future.”
 1900s–1920s – B.citriodora distilled on a small-scale commercial basis around Eumundi, Queensland.
 1920s – Discovery of antimicrobial qualities of steam-distilled B.citriodora oil, by A. R. Penfold and R.Grant, Technological Museum, Sydney.
 1940s –  Tarax Co. use B.citriodora oil as a lemon flavouring during World War II.
 1950s – Some production of oil carried out in the Maryborough and Miriam Vale areas from bush stands by JR Archibold, but the small industry falls into decline.
 1989 – B.citriodora investigated as a potential leaf spice and commercial crop by Peter Hardwick, Wilderness Foods Pty Ltd. The company commissions Dr Ian Southwell, The Essential Oils Unit, Wollongbar Agricultural Institute, to analyse B.citriodora selections  using gas chromatography.
 1990 – Restaurants and food manufacturers supplied with dried B.citriodora leaf by Vic Cherikoff, Bush Tucker Supply Pty Ltd, produced by Russel and Sharon Costin, Limpinwood Gardens.
 1991 – B.citriodora plantation established by Dennis Archer and Rosemary Cullen-Archer, Toona Essential Oils Pty Ltd, ; and subsequent commercial supply of plantation produced B.citriodora oil in 1993.
 1997 –  Large-scale plantations of B.citriodora established in north Queensland, by Australian Native Lemon Myrtle Ltd.
 Late 1990s – B.citriodora begins to be supplied internationally for a range of flavouring, cosmetic and anti-microbial products. Agronomic production of B.citriodora starts to exceed demand.
 2001 – Standards for Oil of B.citriodora established by The Essential Oils Unit, Wollongbar, and Standards Australia.
 2004 – Monograph published on B.citriodora by Toona Essential Oils pty Ltd.
 2010 – Lemon myrtle sells out in London after Jamie Oliver describes it as "pukka" on his TV show.

See also
Citral
Lemon verbena

References

Further reading

APNI Australian Plant Name Index

External links

 Australian Bushfood and Native Medicine Forum
 Broad range of lemon myrtle products and recipes
 Lemon Myrtle from Vic Cherikoff

citriodora
Flora of Queensland
Myrtales of Australia
Trees of Australia
Bushfood
Crops originating from Australia
Medicinal plants of Australia
Australian cuisine
Essential oils
Taxa named by Ferdinand von Mueller